Benny Golson Quartet, also released as Up, Jumped, Spring, is an album by saxophonist/composer Benny Golson that was recorded in 1990 and originally released by the LRC Ltd. label.

Reception

The AllMusic review by Scott Yanow said " the music is excellent ... Golson is heard throughout in top form, stretching himself on Freddie Hubbard's "Up Jumped Spring" (listed as an original called "Up, Jump, Spring!"), Kenny Barron's "Voyage" and his own "Stable Mates." On the latter, Golson plays an effective and intense duet with drummer Reedus. 61 at the time, Benny Golson is heard here at the peak of his powers".

Track listing 
All compositions by Benny Golson except where noted
 "Up Jumped Spring" (Freddie Hubbard) – 10:10
 "Voyage" (Kenny Barron) – 7:50
 "Beautiful Love" (Wayne King, Victor Young, Egbert Van Alstyne, Haven Gillespie) – 14:50
 "Goodbye" (Gordon Jenkins) – 7:30
 "Gypsy Jingle Jangle" – 10:05
 "Stablemates" – 10:58

Personnel 
Benny Golson – tenor saxophone
Mulgrew Miller – piano
Rufus Reid - bass 
Tony Reedus – drums

Production
Dan Lester – producer

References 

Benny Golson albums
1990 albums